Balázs Csillag (born 5 March 1979) is a Hungarian long-distance runner.

He finished seventh in the 5000 metres at the 2002 European Championships, and also competed at the 2006 World Road Running Championships.

His personal best times are 3:41.32 minutes in the 1500 metres, achieved in July 2002 in Győr; 7:52.51 minutes in the 3000 metres, achieved in August 2002 in San Sebastián; 13:26.96 minutes in the 5000 metres, achieved in July 2002 in Heusden-Zolder; 29:38.64 minutes in the 10,000 metres, achieved in April 2006 in Antalya. The 5000 metres result is a Hungarian record.

References

1979 births
Living people
Hungarian male long-distance runners
21st-century Hungarian people